Arford is a village in the East Hampshire district of Hampshire, England, just north of the B3002 road, and is part of the civil parish of Headley.

The village is about half a mile from Headley village centre and 3.5 miles (5.5 km) north of Liphook, which has the nearest railway station.

External links

Villages in Hampshire